Dudi Sela was the defending champion but chose not to defend his title.

Jack Sock won the title after defeating Emilio Gómez 7–5, 6–4 in the final.

Seeds

Draw

Finals

Top half

Bottom half

References

External links
Main draw
Qualifying draw

Little Rock Challenger - 1
Little Rock Challenger